K-Plus (stylized as K+) is a Southeast Asian pay television channel focused on airing drama series, variety shows, movies and lifestyle programmes in K-pop, beauty & fashion as its main programming genre. It was launched on 17 September 2014 and it is available in Indonesia, Malaysia, and Philippines. It also offers select titles to OTT platforms iflix, LeEco and Tribe. K+ is based in Singapore and is owned by Plus Media Networks, a subsidiary of South Korea-based JJ MediaWorks.

History
The channel was first launched in Indonesia in September 2014 on pay-TV provider K-Vision (now ceased since 2016 due to the carriage agreement, but now available on IndiHome since 2016 and Dens.TV since 2017).

On May 25, 2018, K+ was available on Easy TV Home in the Philippines, and now ceased to the operators until September 30, 2019 due to the agreement for broadcasting. On September of that same year, the channel is available on Cablelink. In April 2019, the channel is available on Sky Cable. and Starting January 4, 2021 the channel is available on Cignal.

Starting October 1, 2021 the channel is available on Unifi TV in Malaysia.

The channel was also launched at Astro on May 18, 2022 (which the channel has previously appeared through their Astro GO app exclusively), awhile included on their prepaid satellite service NJOI in early June 2022.

Notes and references

External links
 

Television stations in Singapore
Television channels and stations established in 2014
2014 establishments in Singapore
Mass media in Southeast Asia
Korean-language television stations